Michaela-Batya Bisi Abam (born 12 June 1997) is an American-born Cameroonian professional footballer who plays as a midfielder for the Houston Dash in the National Women's Soccer League and the Cameroon national team. She previously played for Real Betis in the Spanish Primera División, Paris FC in the Division 1 Féminine, Sky Blue FC, and West Virginia University.

College career

West Virginia University, 2014–2017
Abam played in a school record 95 games for the Mountaineers, scoring 42 goals and 16 assists. In 2017, she scored the only goal in a 1–0 win over the University of North Carolina in the College Cup semi-final, leading WVU to their first-everCollege Cup Final.

Club career

Sky Blue FC, 2018
Abam was selected by Sky Blue FC as the 4th overall pick in the 2018 NWSL College Draft. In March she was named to the final roster for the 2018 season. After only appearing in 4 games for Sky Blue, she was released by the team on July 25.

Paris FC, 2018–2019
On August 1, 2018 Abam signed with Paris FC in the Division 1 Féminine in France.

Real Betis, 2019–2020
In August 2019, Abam signed for Spanish Primera División team Real Betis.

Houston Dash, 2021–present
In August 2021, Abam signed for the Houston Dash in the NWSL. Her first appearance was on August 13, 2021 against the Washington Spirit were she scored a goal to give tie the game 2-2, which ended up being the final result of the game.

International career
Abam made her senior debut for Cameroon on 12 November 2018 in a 7–0 friendly win against Zambia, scoring twice. Then, she was called up to compete at the 2018 Africa Women Cup of Nations, but did not make any appearance by problems with her Cameroonian passport. In May 2019, she was named for the 2019 FIFA Women's World Cup.

International goals
Scores and results list Cameroon's goal tally first

References

External links 
 
 

1997 births
Living people
Citizens of Cameroon through descent
Cameroonian women's footballers
Women's association football forwards
Paris FC (women) players
Real Betis Féminas players
Division 1 Féminine players
Primera División (women) players
Cameroon women's international footballers
2019 FIFA Women's World Cup players
Cameroonian expatriate women's footballers
Cameroonian expatriate sportspeople in France
Expatriate women's footballers in France
Cameroonian expatriate sportspeople in Spain
Expatriate women's footballers in Spain
American women's soccer players
Soccer players from Houston
African-American women's soccer players
American people of Cameroonian descent
West Virginia Mountaineers women's soccer players
NJ/NY Gotham FC draft picks
National Women's Soccer League players
NJ/NY Gotham FC players
Houston Dash players
American expatriate women's soccer players
American expatriate sportspeople in France
American expatriate sportspeople in Spain
21st-century African-American sportspeople
21st-century African-American women